Hubbard Glacier, is a glacier in northwestern Greenland. Administratively it belongs to the Avannaata municipality.

This glacier was named by Robert Peary after Gardiner Greene Hubbard (1822 – 1897), founder and first president of the American Geographical Society.

Geography 
The Hubbard Glacier has its terminus in the northern shore of the mid Inglefield Fjord. It discharges from the margins of the Greenland Ice Sheet in Prudhoe Land, flowing roughly from north to south.

Bibliography
Geological Survey of Denmark and Greenland Map Series 2
Deeply incised submarine glacial valleys beneath the Greenland ice

See also
List of glaciers in Greenland
Inglefield Fjord

References

External links
Glacier fluctuations and dynamics around the margin of the Greenland Ice Sheet
Identifying Spatial Variability in Greenland's Outlet Glacier Response to Ocean Heat
Recent ice mass loss in northwestern Greenland
 Glaciers of Greenland